Notgrove Long Barrow is a prehistoric long barrow burial mound in Gloucestershire, England.

It consists of a large mound with a passage running through the centre and several small chambers opening off it.  Human remains were interred in these chambers. It is unlikely that any of these remains are still within the mound, as the barrow was open for thousands of years before being sealed in 1976 to prevent further damage to the site.

References
 English heritage information plaque at the site

External links 
NOTGROVE LONG BARROW, Pastscape
Notgrove at the Megalithic Portal website

English Heritage sites in Gloucestershire
Stone Age sites in England
Tourist attractions in Gloucestershire
Archaeological sites in Gloucestershire